A list of people, who died during the 7th century, who have received recognition as Blessed (through beatification) or Saint (through canonization) from the Catholic Church:

Saints

See also 

Christianity in the 7th century

References

07
07
Saint